WZ Columbae, also known as HD 38170, is a solitary, bluish-white hued star located in the southern constellation  Columba, the dove. It has an apparent magnitude of 5.28, allowing it to be faintly visible to the naked eye. Based on parallax measurements from the Gaia spacecraft, the object is about 365 light years distant.

WZ Columbae was originally listed as a slowly pulsating B-type star by the General Catalogue of Variable Stars. However, observations from Hempel & Howlger (2003) reveal it to be overabundant in strontium and barium. Combined with Hipparcos photometry, this led to the object being reclassified as an Alpha2 Canum Venaticorum variable. Based on data collected in the Hipparcos passband, it fluctuates between magnitudes 5.27 and 5.29 over 1.38 days. However, TESS data suggests a period of  days; double that of the earlier data.

The stellar classification of WZ Columbae is B9/9.5 V — a main-sequence star with the characteristics of a B9 and B9.5 star. It has 3.07 times the mass of the Sun and is estimated to be 394 million years old, having completed 89.2% of its main sequence lifetime. This yields a luminosity 124 times that of the Sun from its photosphere.

References

B-type main-sequence stars
Columbae, WZ
Alpha2 Canum Venaticorum variables
038170
CD-34 02401
026868
1973
Columbae, 42
Columba (constellation)